Zereshlu (also Romanized as Zereshlū) is a village in Kolah Boz-e Gharbi Rural District, in the Central District of Meyaneh County, East Azerbaijan Province, Iran. At the 2006 census, its population was 98, in 13 families.

References 

Populated places in Meyaneh County